The  is a class of 0-10-0 steam locomotives built by the Japanese Government Railways (JGR) and designed by Hideo Shima. A total of 39 locomotives were built by Kawasaki Shipyard (present-day Kawasaki Heavy Industries), as copies of the earlier Class 4100 0-10-0T locomotives imported from Maffei in Germany in 1912.

Five members of the class were converted to standard gauge and sent to Korea in 1939, four to the Pyeongbuk Railway and one to the Danpung Railway. After the partition of Korea in 1945, all five locomotives were taken over by the Korean State Railway of North Korea, but their subsequent fate is unknown be it was assumed that they were scrapped around between 1969 and 1976 . Some 4110s were sent to Taiwan during the occupation period. In 1945, all of them were classified as Taiwan Railways class EK900. None of them have preserved all of the EK900’s were scrapped between 1975 and 1980 .

Preserved examples

One Class 4110 remains in preservation: 4122 in Ebetsu, Hokkaido.

Gallery

See also
 Japan Railways locomotive numbering and classification

References

0-10-0 locomotives
Steam locomotives of Japan
Locomotives of Korea
Locomotives of North Korea
Steam locomotives of Taiwan
1067 mm gauge locomotives of Japan
Preserved steam locomotives of Japan
Railway locomotives introduced in 1948
Freight locomotives